Flower Power is the fourth album by Filipino band, Callalily. It was launched on October 13, 2012. It is their first released under Universal Records. This is also the band's first album as a four-piece band.

Track listing

References

Callalily albums
2012 albums